The House Urns culture was an early Iron Age culture of the 7th century BC in central Germany, in the Region between Harz Mountains and the junction of river Saale to river Elbe. It was the western periphery of the bronze and Iron Age Lusatian culture.

Urns in the shape of house models were its characteristical sign. They were set in gravefields that had already been used for centuries, but sometimes in these gravefields they were deposited in stone cists that were an innovation. So it is considered that religious beliefs changed in that time, though the bias was not as great as in the Mediterranean region and in the area of the Hallstatt culture.  Archeologists see an obvious connection to the Pomeranian culture of the same age. The relation to the pre-Etruscan Villanovan culture, which had its summit about 1 ½ centuries before, is questioned.

Literature
Hallstattzeit, Die Altertümer im Museum für Vor- und Frühgeschichte, Bd. 2, 1999, 

Archaeological cultures of Central Europe
Archaeological cultures in Germany
Iron Age cultures of Europe